Bob Perry (December 26, 1878 – January 8, 1962) was an American film actor. He appeared in more than 190 films between 1912 and 1965.

Selected filmography
The Devil Within (1921)
 Iron to Gold (1922)
 Volcano! (1926)
 Jaws of Steel (1927)
 The Fortune Hunter (1927)
 The Singing Fool (1928)
 Shadows of the Night (1928)
 Sin Town (1929)
 Noisy Neighbors (1929)
 The Sea God (1930)
 The Finger Points (1931)
 The Lawyer's Secret (1931)
 The Fighting Marshal (1931)
 Hideaway (1937)
 Manhattan Merry-Go-Round (1937)

References

External links

1878 births
1962 deaths
20th-century American male actors
American male film actors
Male actors from New York City